Georgios Karaminas is a Paralympic athlete from Greece competing mainly in category F52 shot put events.

Georgios has competed in the shot put and javelin at every Paralympics between 1992 and 2008, but it was in the shot put in 2004 that he won his only a medal, a silver.

References

Paralympic athletes of Greece
Athletes (track and field) at the 1992 Summer Paralympics
Athletes (track and field) at the 1996 Summer Paralympics
Athletes (track and field) at the 2000 Summer Paralympics
Athletes (track and field) at the 2004 Summer Paralympics
Athletes (track and field) at the 2008 Summer Paralympics
Paralympic silver medalists for Greece
Living people
Medalists at the 2004 Summer Paralympics
Year of birth missing (living people)
Paralympic medalists in athletics (track and field)
21st-century Greek people